Charles Hallwood was a Scottish professional football goalkeeper who played in the Scottish League for Lochgelly United and Heart of Midlothian.

Personal life 
Hallwood served as a sapper in the Royal Engineers during the First World War.

Career statistics

References 

Scottish footballers
Scottish Football League players
British Army personnel of World War I
Heart of Midlothian F.C. players
Year of birth missing
Year of death missing
Place of birth missing
Association football goalkeepers
Royal Engineers soldiers